Polgear is a group of farms south of Four Lanes in west  Cornwall, England.

See also

 List of farms in Cornwall

References

Farms in Cornwall